Peter Hoag Jr. (born March 17, 1954) is an American biathlete. He competed in the 10 km sprint event at the 1980 Winter Olympics.

References

External links
 

1954 births
Living people
American male biathletes
Olympic biathletes of the United States
Biathletes at the 1980 Winter Olympics
Sportspeople from Minneapolis
Skiers from Minneapolis